Tash Harris (born October 28, 1983) is an Antiguan footballer who currently plays for Antigua Barracuda FC in the USL Professional Division.

Club career
Harris began his career with Old Road FC, and played 6 seasons for them in the Antigua and Barbuda Premier Division between 2006 and 2010, before joining Antigua Barracuda FC in 2011. He made his debut for Barracuda on April 17, 2011, in the team's first competitive game, a 2–1 loss to the Los Angeles Blues.

International career
Harris has been capped once for the Antigua and Barbuda national team in 2008.

References

External links

1983 births
Living people
Antigua and Barbuda footballers
Antigua and Barbuda international footballers
Antigua Barracuda F.C. players
USL Championship players
Old Road F.C. players
Association football defenders